The NorthernTool.com 250 is a discontinued NASCAR Nationwide Series race held at the Milwaukee Mile. From 1986 to 1992, no race was held. In 1993, the race returned, and was increased to 250 laps, a distance it would remain at until the final race was held in 2009. The race was traditionally held Sunday afternoons, while the Cup Series was either off or at a different venue, but starting in 2004, the race was run on Saturday night.

Until the race sponsor changed to Camping World in 2008, the sponsorship of this race was not affected by the September 7, 2007, settlement between AT&T and NASCAR in regard to a grandfathered sponsorship deal, as Anheuser-Busch, the sponsor of the series at the time of the lawsuit, was not associated with the wireless industry. The 2010 race was canceled and the Wisconsin date was moved north to Road America.

Past winners

2005: Race shortened due to rain.
2006: Race extended due to NASCAR overtime.
2007: Denny Hamlin finished the race in relief of Almirola (Hamlin was supposed to start but arrived late due to Cup Series commitments). Per NASCAR rules Almirola is credited with the victory and the points.

References

External links
 

Former NASCAR races
NASCAR Xfinity Series races